Neil Brenner (born 1969) is an American urban theorist and academic serving as Lucy Flower Professor of Urban Sociology at the University of Chicago. He previously served as Professor of Urban Theory and Director of Urban Theory Lab at Harvard Graduate School of Design, and as Professor of Sociology at New York University. He has also held previous visiting appointments at National University of Singapore, University of Amsterdam, Bard College, Maynooth University, University of Bristol, and University of Urbino. He is a member of the American Sociological Association and the Association of American Geographers.

He serves on the advisory and editorial board of 14 academic journals and has edited or authored more than 10 award-winning books. Brenner's works have been translated into Chinese, Croatian, Finnish, French, Hungarian, German, Italian, Japanese, Korean, Persian, Polish, Portuguese, Spanish, and Turkish.

Affiliated institutions
 B.A., Philosophy, (Summa Cum Laude) Yale College, 1991 
 M.A., Political Science, University of Chicago, 1994
 M.A., Geography, UCLA, 1996 
 Lecturer, Depts. of Sociology and Political Science, University of Chicago, 1997
 Ph.D., Political Science, University of Chicago, 1999 
 Postdoctoral Fellow in German and European Studies, Center for European Studies, Harvard University (2001-2002)
 Adjunct Assistant Professor of Urban Planning, Columbia Graduate School of Architecture, Planning and Preservation (2003)
 Assistant Professor, Dept. of Sociology and Metropolitan Studies, New York University (1999-2006)
 Professor, Dept. of Sociology and Metropolitan Studies, New York University (2006-2011)
 Professor of Urban Theory, Harvard Graduate School of Design (2011-2020)
 Lucy Flower Professor of Urban Sociology, Dept. of Sociology and the College, University of Chicago (2020-present)

Awards
 Riggs Memorial Prize in the Humanities, Yale College (1988).
 Phi Beta Kappa (1991)
 Senior Thesis Prize in Political Theory, Department of Political Science, Yale College (1991)
 Fulbright Scholarship, Division of Philosophy and Social Sciences, Freie Universität, Berlin (1991-1992)
 Bundeskanzler Fellowship/Alexander von Humboldt Stiftung (1997-1998)
 Donald Robertson Memorial Prize, Editorial Board of Urban Studies (1999)
 Young Researcher’s Award, Royal Geographical Society (2000)
 Honorable Mention, Distinguished Publication Award, Political Sociology Section, American Sociological Association (2005).
 Honorable Mention, Outstanding Publication Award, Political Sociology Section, American Sociological Association (2005)
 Honorary Master of Arts, Harvard University Graduate School of Design (2012)
 Academic Committee Award, Bi-City Biennale of Urbanism/Architecture, Shenzhen, China (2016)
 Weatherhead Center Distinguished Research Faculty Associate, Weatherhead Center for International Affairs, Harvard University (2020)
 Thompson Reuters Highly Cited Researcher (2014)

Selected Journal Articles
 Brenner, N. "Globalisation as reterritorialisation: the re-scaling of urban governance in the European Union." Urban Studies 36 (3), pp. 431-451 (1999)
 Brenner, N. "The limits to scale? Methodological reflections on scalar structuration." Progress in Human Geography 25 (4), pp. 591-614 (2001)
 Brenner, N. and Theodore, N. "Cities and the geographies of 'actually existing neoliberalism.'" Antipode 34 (3), pp. 349-379 (2002) 
 Brenner, N., Peck, J., and Theodore, N. "Variegated neoliberalization: geographies, modalities, pathways." Global Networks 10 (2), pp. 182-222 (2010)
 Brenner, N. and Schmid, C. "Towards a new epistemology of the urban?" City 19 (2-3), pp. 151-182 (2015)

Bibliography

Authored books in English
 New State Spaces: Urban Governance and the Rescaling of Statehood (2004)
 Critique of Urbanization: Selected Essays (2016)
 New Urban Spaces: Urban Theory and the Scale Question (2019)

Authored books in other languages
 La explosion de lo urbano 
 Stato, spazio, urbanizzazione (2017)
 Teoría urbana crítica y políticas de escala (2017)
 Espaços da Urbanização: o urbano a partir da teoria crítica (2018)
 城市，地域，星球：批判城市理论 / City, Territory, Planet: Studies in Critical Urban Theory (2020)

Edited and co-edited books
 Implosions/Explosions: Towards a Study of Planetary Urbanization (2014)
  Cities for People, not for Profit: Critical Urban Theory and the Right to the City (2011)
 Henri Lefebvre, State, Space, World (2009)
 The Global Cities Reader (2006)
 State/Space: A Reader (2003)
 Spaces of Neoliberalism: Urban Restructuring in Western Europe and North America (2002)

Pamphlets
 "The Afterlives of Neoliberalism" (2012)

References 

American academics
Living people
American urban planners
1969 births